MS Majesty may refer to the following ships:

 , known as Majesty (2017–2018)
 , known as Majesty (2020–2021)

Ship names